Dielectric elastomers (DEs) are smart material systems that produce large strains. They belong to the group of electroactive polymers (EAP). DE actuators (DEA) transform electric energy into mechanical work. They are lightweight and have a high elastic energy density. They have been investigated since the late 1990s. Many prototype applications exist. Every year, conferences are held in the US and Europe.

Working principles 

A DEA is a compliant capacitor (see image), where a passive elastomer film is sandwiched between two compliant electrodes. When a voltage  is applied, the electrostatic pressure  arising from the  Coulomb forces acts between the electrodes. The electrodes squeeze the elastomer film. The equivalent electromechanical pressure  is twice the electrostatic pressure  and is given by:

Usually, strains of DEA are in the order of 10–35%, maximum values reach 300% (the acrylic elastomer VHB 4910, commercially available from 3M, which also supports a high elastic energy density and a high electrical breakdown strength.)

Ionic 

Replacing the electrodes with soft hydrogels allows ionic transport to replace electron transport. Aqueous ionic hydrogels can deliver potentials of multiple kilovolts, despite the onset of electrolysis at below 1.5 V.

The difference between the capacitance of the double layer and the dielectric leads to a potential across the dielectric that can be millions of times greater than that across the double layer. Potentials in the kilovolt range can be realized without electrochemically degrading the hydrogel.

Deformations are well controlled, reversible, and capable of high-frequency operation. The resulting devices can be perfectly transparent. High-frequency actuation is possible. Switching speeds are limited only by mechanical inertia. The hydrogel's stiffness can be thousands of times smaller than the dielectric's, allowing actuation without mechanical constraint across a range of nearly 100% at millisecond speeds. They can be biocompatible.

Remaining issues include drying of the hydrogels, ionic build-up, hysteresis, and electrical shorting.

Early experiments in semiconductor device research relied on ionic conductors to investigate field modulation of contact potentials in silicon and to enable the first solid-state amplifiers. Work since 2000 has established the utility of electrolyte gate electrodes. Ionic gels can also serve as elements of high-performance, stretchable graphene transistors.

Materials 

Films of carbon powder or grease loaded with carbon black were early choices as electrodes for the DEAs. Such materials have poor reliability and are not available with established manufacturing techniques. Improved characteristics can be achieved with liquid metal, sheets of graphene, coatings of carbon nanotubes, surface-implanted layers of metallic nanoclusters and corrugated or patterned metal films.

These options offer limited mechanical properties, sheet resistances, switching times and easy integration. Silicones and acrylic elastomers are other alternatives.

The requirements for an elastomer material are:

 The material should have low stiffness (especially when large strains are required);
 The dielectric constant should be high;
 The electrical breakdown strength should be high.

Mechanically prestretching the elastomer film offers the possibility of enhancing the electrical breakdown strength. Further reasons for prestretching include:

 Film thickness decreases, requiring a lower voltage to obtain the same electrostatic pressure;
 Avoiding compressive stresses in the film plane directions.

The elastomers show a visco-hyperelastic behavior. Models that describe large strains and viscoelasticity are required for the calculation of such actuators.

Materials used in research include graphite powder, silicone oil / graphite mixtures, gold electrodes. The electrode should be conductive and compliant. Compliance is important so that the elastomer is not constrained mechanically when elongated.

Films of polyacrylamide hydrogels formed with salt water can be laminated onto the dielectric surfaces, replacing electrodes.

DEs based on silicone (PDMS) and natural rubber are promising research fields. Properties such as fast response times and efficiency are superior using natural rubber based DEs compared to VHB (acrylic elastomer) based DEs for strains under 15%.

Instabilities in Dielectric elastomers 

Dielectric elastomer actuators are to be designed so as to avoid the phenomenon of dielectric breakdown in their whole course of
motion. In addition to the dielectric breakdown, DEAs are susceptible to another failure mode, referred to as the electromechanical
instability, which arises due to nonlinear interaction between the electrostatic and the mechanical restoring forces. In several cases, the electromechanical instability precedes the dielectric breakdown. The instability
parameters (critical voltage and the corresponding maximum stretch) are dependent on several factors, such as the level of prestretch, temperature, and the deformation dependent permittivity. Additionally, they also depend on the voltage
waveform used to drive the actuator.

Configurations 

Configurations include:

 Framed/In-Plane actuators: A framed or in-plane actuator is an elastomeric film coated/printed with two electrodes. Typically a frame or support structure is mounted around the film. Examples are expanding circles and planars (single and multiple phase.)
 Cylindrical/Roll actuators: Coated elastomer films are rolled around an axis. By activation, a force and an elongation appear in the axial direction. The actuators can be rolled around a compression spring or without a core. Applications include artificial muscles (prosthetics), mini- and microrobots, and valves.
 Diaphragm actuators: A diaphragm actuator is made as a planar construction which is then biased in the z-axis to produce out of plane motion.
 Shell-like actuators: Planar elastomer films are coated at specific locations in the form of electrode segments. With a well-directed activation, the foils assume complex three-dimensional shapes. Examples may be utilized for propelling vehicles through air or water, e.g. for blimps.
 Stack actuators: Stacking planar actuators can increase deformation. Actuators that shorten under activation are good candidates.
 Thickness Mode Actuators: The force and stroke moves in the z-direction (out of plane). Thickness mode actuators are a typically a flat film that may stack layers to increase displacement.
Bending actuators:The in-plane actuation of dielectric elastomer (DE) based actuator is converted into out-of-plane actuation such as bending or folding using unimorph configuration where one or multiple layers of DE sheets are stacked on top of one layer of inactive substrate.
Balloon actuators: Plane elastomer is attached to an air chamber and inflated with a constant volume of air, then the stiffness of the elastomer can be varied by applying electrical load; hence resulting in voltage-controlled bulging of the elastomeric balloon.

Applications 

Dielectric elastomers offer multiple potential applications with the potential to replace many electromagnetic actuators, pneumatics and piezo actuators. A list of potential applications include:

References

Further reading

External links 
 Smart Materials & Structures (EAP/AFC) program at Empa
 European Scientific Network for Artificial Muscles
 EuroEAP - International conference on Electromechanically Active Polymer (EAP) transducers & artificial muscles
 WorldWide Electroactive Polymer Actuators * Webhub: Yoseph Bar-Cohen's link compendium at JPL
 
 Danfoss PolyPower
 The Biomimetics Laboratory at The University of Auckland
 Dielectric Elastomer Stack Actuators (DESA) at Technische Universität Darmstadt
 PolyWEC EU Project: New mechanisms and concepts for exploiting electroactive Polymers for Wave Energy Conversion

Smart materials
Conductive polymers

nl:Smart material